Antti Ylönen (born September 15, 1983) is a Finnish ice hockey defenceman currently playing for Lahti Pelicans of the SM-liiga. He has won three SM-liiga championships (2005, 2007, 2008) and one B-junior championship (2000), all in Kärpät.

External links

1983 births
Finnish ice hockey defencemen
Hokki players
Oulun Kärpät players
Living people